Humorology, or "Humo" for short, is an annual juried musical/variety show that takes place at the Union Theater of the University of Wisconsin–Madison. The competition consists of six original mini musical comedies written, produced and performed by independent companies and overseen by a student-run executive board. Begun in 1947, Humorology is one of the oldest traditions at the UW–Madison.

About the show
Humorology is a competition among mini-musical comedy shows. Each 18-minute show takes popular music and adapts it into a story with singing, dancing, and comedy. Each show is written, directed, choreographed, and performed by students and the sets and costumes are student-made. Rehearsals begin in early October, when each cast prepares a nine-minute first half of their show to audition for the final show. Auditions take place in December when six casts are selected to move on to the final show, which is held in April in the Wisconsin Union Theater (Overture Center for the Arts 2013). In preparation for the final show, the remaining six casts lengthen their shows by nine minutes to produce an 18-minute mini-musical comedy. The six mini-musical comedies are performed over a series of three nights. On the final night of the show awards are given to the top three shows determined by a panel of judges. Additional "Caption" awards are given for Best Musical Number, Best Use of Theme, Best Female Performer, Best Male Performer, Best Dance Break, and Funniest Show.

The companies
Each Humo company consists of members of a UW–Madison fraternity teamed with members of a sorority. Individuals independent of the Greek system also participate. Nine companies and shows are created every year, but only six shows make it through auditions to the final performance in April.

Charities
Proceeds from Humorology performances are donated to several local Madison children's charities. Some of the charities include the Boys and Girls Club, The Rainbow Project, and most recently the Respite Center.

Changes
In 2014 the fundraising structure of Humorology, Inc. was changed, with greater emphasis placed on the philanthropic aspect of the show. These changes brought the donations from a record low in 2013 to a record high in 2014. There was also a change in how the winning cast was chosen. Instead of the best show being selected, the best three shows were selected. Of the three casts picked, the winner was chosen based on the amount of funds the cast raised.

Recent history

External links
 Official Humorology website

University of Wisconsin–Madison